"Blue Mood" is the debut single by British band Swing Out Sister. It was released in 1985, but it did not chart. It appears on the first album, It's Better to Travel.

Remixes

UK 12" Single 

"Blue Mood" [Growler Mix] - 7:00
"Blue Mood" [7" Version] - 4:17
"Wake Me When It's Over" - 4:31

UK 2nd 12" Single 

"Blue Mood" [Dubbed Up Version] - 6:48
"Blue Mood" [12" Version] - 4:14
"Wake Me When It's Over" - 4:31

UK 7" Single 

"Blue Mood" [7" Version] - 4:17
"Wake Me When It's Over" - 4:31

A new version appeared in the band's debut album It's Better to Travel. This version is mixed differently to sound more polished than the original single version, and it also appears in their  compilation album Breakout. The Growler and Dubbed Up Version mixes of "Blue Mood" also appear in the 2012 expanded 2CD edition of It's Better to Travel.

Swing Out Sister songs
1985 singles
1985 songs
Mercury Records singles
Songs written by Andy Connell
Songs written by Corinne Drewery
Songs written by Martin Jackson